Noctua noacki is a species of moth of the family Noctuidae. It is found on the Canary Islands.

It is commonly misspelled noaki instead of noacki.

Noctua (moth)